Autumn Milk is a 1989 film directed by Joseph Vilsmaier. It is based on the autobiography of Anna Wimschneider.

The film was bestowed awards at the 39th German Film Awards in Berlin: the silver Filmband for the film and the golden Filmband for new talent for the leading actress Dana Vávrová. It also won new talent awards for Dana Vávrová and Werner Stocker at the 10th Bavarian film prize.

It was a great box-office success, with over two million viewers.

Plot
This cinematic adaptation of the autobiography of Anna Wimschneider depicts her life's experiences and workaday routines as a woman born on a farm in Lower Bavaria, Germany in the 1920s. Anna's mother died young in childbirth and Anna had to take her place and work very hard. On a Nazi Party rally she meets young Albert, who owns a farm. They realize that they both don't believe into Fascism and go to a coffee bar where he starts wooing her. Against her prior decision to leave farm life as soon as possible, she agrees to marry him, hoping that her life will become easier on Albert's farm.

References

External links

1988 films
1988 drama films
German drama films
Films based on autobiographies
Films directed by Joseph Vilsmaier
1980s German-language films
West German films
Films set in the 1920s
Films set in the 1930s
Films set in the 1940s
Films set in Bavaria
Films about agriculture
1980s German films